Push Panic is an tile-matching video game for iOS developed by American studio Appular and released on November 23, 2010.

Gameplay
Players clear away similarly-colored blocks on the screen, and can use bombs to aid them.

Reception
The game has a Metacritic rating of 88% based on 6 critic reviews.

SlideToPlay said " Matching colors, toppling block towers, a drive for instant solutions--it's like experiencing a first grader's night terror. " AppSpy wrote "Push Panic is a perfect companion for those who want to blast away a few spare minutes or those who want to push the boundaries of their high-score skills; a great addition to anyone's collection. " 148Apps described it as "Ridiculously good fun." Multiplayer.it said "Push Panic delivers some fresh and enjoyable puzzle action, thanks to the excellent touch controls. The game comes with fifty levels and four modes, enough to keep you busy for hours. What a pity there's no online multiplayer. " TouchGen wrote "It's one of those games that has the addictive factor that keeps you going back to it again and again for more, coupled with perfectly fitting visuals I find it hard to fault this game. " PocketGamerUK said " Straightforward colour-matching mechanics, challenging modes, and excellent replay value make Push Panic highly recommended. "

References

2010 video games
Android (operating system) games
IOS games
Puzzle video games
Video games developed in the United States